Jackie Chavez (born June 1, 1983 in Albuquerque, New Mexico) is an American former professional boxer in the Super Bantamweight division. She was the IFBA world Super Bantamweight champion, and considered by many to be one of women's boxing's future stars. As far as it is known, she has no relation with Mexican boxing legend Julio César Chávez.

Pro career
Chavez began her professional boxing career on October 5, 2001, when, at the age of eighteen, she knocked out the more experienced Brandy Leon in three rounds at Acoma, New Mexico.

Her second fight came on December 14 of that year, and she beat Nicole Gallegos by a majority decision in four rounds, also at Acoma.

On March 23, 2002, she had her first fight outside the Acoma area, when she knocked out Evangelina Abeyta in the first round. This fight was held at Pojoaque, New Mexico.

Chavez kept her winning ways on her next fight when, on April 13, she fought Jodi Johnson on the Isleta Indian Reservation. She scored her second first round knockout in a row that night.

Jackie Chavez next made her Albuquerque, New Mexico debut, when she faced Raquelle Tebo on September 17. She outpointed Tebo, who had only one defeat before that fight, in four rounds.

Chavez had a forced lay-off from boxing after that fight, spending 2003 without fighting anyone. But, on February 21, 2004, she returned to the boxing ring, in Roswell, the town that is better known for the alleged spaceship crash of the 1950s. In Roswell, she beat LeAnne Villareal by a four round unanimous decision in a somewhat unusual scenario for a boxing fight: Roswell high school.

Already ranked among the top ten Super Bantamweights in women's boxing by the IFBA, Chavez next boxed Mercedes Mercury on April 10 in Albuquerque. She outpointed Mercury after six rounds, solidifying her ranking among the women fighters in the Super Bantamweight division.

On November 20, 2004, Chavez had her first world championship try, in what also marked her first fight outside of New Mexico. Fighting for the IFBA's vacant world Super Bantamweight title, she outpointed Jayla Ortiz over ten rounds in Ignacio, Colorado, to become a world champion boxer.

On June 12, 2005, Chavez retained her title by outpointing Audrey Vela by a split ten round decision in San Juan Pueblo, New Mexico. Then, Chavez fought her first fight abroad, fighting for the WIBA championship against Lisa Brown in Mucurapo, Trinidad and Tobago, losing by a ten round unanimous decision. She vacated the IFBA's version of the title before the fight with Brown.

On January 27, 2006, Chavez fought Jeri Sitzes for the NABF's women's Featherweight title, in Hollywood, California, losing by ten round unanimous decision. Chavez took one year off from boxing, she then faced Lisa Brown in a rematch, this time at Albuquerque, with the IFBA Super Bantamweight title on the line, but lost again, on March 22, 2007, by a unanimous ten round decision. Chavez's last fight to date was against Puerto Rican Ada Velez, another world champion boxer. This bout took place on September 21, 2007, and she lost a close, majority six round decision.

She thus left boxing with a 4 fight losing streak.

Chavez had 13 bouts, winning 9 and losing her last 4, with 3 wins by knockout.

Professional boxing record

References

External links
 

American women boxers
American boxers of Mexican descent
Sportspeople from Las Cruces, New Mexico
1983 births
Living people
Boxers from Albuquerque, New Mexico
Super-bantamweight boxers
21st-century American women